Bardin is a surname. Notable people with the surname include:

Jean Bardin, French painter 
Garri Bardin, Russian animation director 
John Franklin Bardin, American crime writer 
Pierre Bardin, French philosopher 
Ivan Bardin, Soviet metallurgist
Nikolai Bardin, Russian hockey player 

French-language surnames